Dave Mirra BMX Challenge is a racing video game by Crave Entertainment for the PlayStation Portable and later for the Nintendo Wii. It was the only entry in the Dave Mirra series released by Crave Entertainment after the previous publisher, Acclaim Entertainment, filed for bankruptcy in 2004, and the final entry in the series overall.

Gameplay 

The PSP version consists of three modes: exhibition, quickplay, and a career mode. The career mode consists of race and trick events. Career mode has different levels of difficulty as well, which adds more challenge to the game. The Wii version likewise has many of the same modes, including career mode and bases most of the game around it.

Reception 

The game received "generally unfavorable reviews" on both platforms according to video game review aggregator Metacritic.

References

External links 
 

2006 video games
505 Games games
Mirra, Dave BMX Challenge
Crave Entertainment games
Left Field Productions games
PlayStation Portable games
Racing video games
Video games developed in the United States
Wii games
Single-player video games
Oxygen Games games